Convict's Code is a 1939 American film directed by Lambert Hillyer.

Cast 
Robert Kent as Dave Tyler
Anne Nagel as Julie Warren
Sidney Blackmer as Gregory Warren
Victor Kilian as Bennett
Norman Willis as Russell
Maude Eburne as Mrs. Magruder
Ben Alexander as Jeff Palmer
Pat Flaherty as Sniffy
Carleton Young as Pete Jennings
Howard C. Hickman as Warden
Joan Barclay as Elaine
Harry Strang as Tom Lynch

External links 

1939 films
1939 drama films
Monogram Pictures films
American black-and-white films
American drama films
Films directed by Lambert Hillyer
1930s English-language films
1930s American films